Matthias Hamann (born 10 February 1968, in Waldsassen) is a German football manager and former player. He is the brother of Dietmar Hamann.

Hamann made 59 appearances in the Bundesliga during his playing career.

Hamann worked as a scout as part of the staff for head coach Jürgen Klinsmann on the United States national team until Klinsmann was fired in November 2016.

He now works as scout for Bundesliga team Eintracht Frankfurt.

References

External links 
 

1968 births
Living people
People from Tirschenreuth (district)
Sportspeople from the Upper Palatinate
German footballers
Footballers from Bavaria
Association football defenders
Bundesliga players
2. Bundesliga players
FC Bayern Munich footballers
FC Bayern Munich II players
SC Fortuna Köln players
SpVgg Unterhaching players
SV Eintracht Trier 05 players
1. FC Kaiserslautern players
TSV 1860 Munich players
Neuchâtel Xamax FCS players
Tennis Borussia Berlin players
Rot Weiss Ahlen players
LASK players
German football managers
KSV Hessen Kassel managers
LASK managers
German expatriate footballers
German expatriate football managers
German expatriate sportspeople in Switzerland
Expatriate footballers in Switzerland
German expatriate sportspeople in Austria
Expatriate footballers in Austria
Expatriate football managers in Austria